Galleh Kola-ye Kar Kandeh (also Romanized as Galleh Kolā-ye Kār Kandeh; also known as Galleh Kolā) is a village in Mazkureh Rural District, in the Central District of Sari County, Mazandaran Province, Iran. At the 2006 census, its population was 228, in 64 families.

References 

Populated places in Sari County